Västra Frölunda Idrottsförening (English: Västra Frölunda Sports Association) is a Swedish football club located in Gothenburg. It was formed on 2 January 1930 and has played ten seasons in the Allsvenskan, the highest Swedish league. In the 2020 season, it plays in the fourth-highest Swedish league, Division 2 Västra Götaland. The club is affiliated to the Göteborgs Fotbollförbund.

Achievements
 Division 1 Södra:
 Winners (1): 1997
 Division 1 Västra:
 Winners (1): 1991

Current squad

Season to season

Attendances

In recent seasons Västra Frölunda IF have had the following average attendances:

References

External links
 

Västra Frölunda IF
Allsvenskan clubs
Football clubs in Gothenburg
Association football clubs established in 1930
1930 establishments in Sweden
Football clubs in Västra Götaland County